The Val Verde Unified School District is one of two public education governing bodies in Moreno Valley, California which stretches into Perris, California. It currently operates 21 schools and is the neighbor to its larger counterpart, the Moreno Valley Unified School District. This district serves 19,303 students as of 2021.

Schools

Preschools
El Potrero Preschool

Elementary schools
 Avalon Elementary
 Columbia Elementary
 Lasselle Elementary
 Manuel L. Real Elementary
 Mary McLeod Bethune Elementary
 May Ranch Elementary
 Mead Valley Elementary
 Rainbow Ridge Elementary
 Sierra Vista Elementary
 Triple Crown Elementary
 Val Verde Elementary
 Victoriano Elementary

Middle schools
 March Middle School
 Lakeside Middle School
 Tomas Rivera Middle School
 Vista Verde Middle School

High schools
Citrus Hill High School
Rancho Verde High School
 Val Verde Academy
Val Verde High School
 Orange Vista High School

School Board
Michael McCormick - Superintendent
Suzanne Stotlar - President
Julio Gonzalez - Vice President
Shelly Yarbrough - Clerk
Marla Kirkland -Member
Matthew Serafin - Member

See also
List of school districts in Riverside County, California

References

External links
 

School districts in Riverside County, California
Perris, California